The katipō (Latrodectus katipo) is an endangered species of spider native to New Zealand. It is one of many species in the genus Latrodectus, such as the Australian redback (L. hasseltii), and the North American black widow. The species is venomous to humans, capable of delivering a potentially dangerous bite. It is a small to medium-sized spider, with the female having a round black or brown pea-sized body. Red katipō females found in the South Island and the lower half of the North Island, are always black, and their abdomen has a distinctive red stripe bordered in white. In black katipō females found in the upper half of the North Island, this stripe is absent, pale, yellow, or replaced with cream-coloured blotches. These two forms were previously thought to be separate species. The male is much smaller than the female and quite different in appearance: white with black stripes and red diamond-shaped markings. Katipō are mainly found living in sand dunes close to the seashore. They are found throughout most of coastal New Zealand except the far south and west. Katipō feed mainly on ground dwelling insects, caught in an irregular tangled web spun amongst dune plants or other debris.

After mating in August or September, the female katipō produces five or six egg sacs in November or December. The spiderlings hatch during January and February and disperse into surrounding plants. Due to habitat loss and colonisation of their natural habitat by other exotic spiders, the katipō is threatened with extinction.

A katipō bite produces the toxic syndrome latrodectism; symptoms include extreme pain and, potentially, hypertension, seizure, or coma. Bites are rare, an antivenom is available, and no deaths have been reported since 1901. The katipō is particularly notable in New Zealand as the nation is almost entirely devoid of dangerous native wildlife; this unique status means the spider is well known, despite being rarely seen.

Taxonomy
Although the 'kātĕpo' was reported to the Linnean Society as early as 1855, the spider was formally described as Latrodectus katipo by L. Powell in 1870. Spiders of the genus Latrodectus have a worldwide distribution and include all of the commonly known widow spiders: the North American black widow spider (Latrodectus mactans), the brown widow (Latrodectus geometricus), and the European black widow (Latrodectus tredecimguttatus). The katipō's closest relative is the Australian redback spider (Latrodectus hasseltii). Latrodectus katipo and L. atritus (black katipō) were previously thought to be two separate species, but research has shown that they are a single species, L. katipo, with colour variation that is clinal over latitude and correlated with mean annual temperature. The katipō is so closely related to the redback that it was at one stage thought to be a subspecies, with the proposed name Latrodectus hasseltii katipo. Further research has shown that the katipō is distinct from the redback, having slight structural differences and striking differences in habitat preference, and it remains a distinct species. The katipō's family Theridiidae has a large number of species both in New Zealand and worldwide. They are commonly known as tangle-web spiders, cobweb spiders or comb-footed spiders.

The common name katipō (singular and plural), often spelled "katipo", is from the Māori for "night stinger", derived from the words kakati (to sting) and pō (the night). This name was apparently given to the species owing to the Māori belief that the spiders bite at night. Other common names include red katipō, black katipō and New Zealand's redback.

Description
The katipō is a small to medium-sized spider. The red katipō female, found in the South Island and the lower North Island, has a large black globular abdomen, about the size of a garden pea, with slender legs and a white-bordered orange or red stripe on its back that runs from the uppermost surface of the abdomen back to the spinnerets. The dark velvet-black abdomen is described as satin or silky in appearance, rather than being shiny. The underside of the abdomen is black and has a red patch or partial red hourglass-shaped marking. It has mainly black legs with the extremities changing to brown. The black katipō female, found in the upper North Island, does not have a red stripe on the top of its body, and the abdominal colouration is usually lighter, but is otherwise very similar in appearance to the red katipō. The hourglass pattern on the underside of the abdomen may also be less distinct, losing the middle section, and may even be absent. Variations also exist where the abdomen, cephalothorax, or entire body is brown, sometimes with a dull red or yellow stripe, or cream-coloured spots on its upper side. These different forms were at one point thought to be different species, but a 2008 study demonstrated they were different morphs of the same species.

Adult males and juveniles are quite different in appearance to the female. They are smaller in size, being about one sixth the size of an adult female. Juveniles have a brown carapace, with a predominantly white abdomen which has a series of red-orange diamonds running along the dorsal region bordered on either side by irregular black lines. Males retain this coloration into adulthood. Due to its much smaller size, Urquhart (1886) believed the male to be a separate species and named it Theridion melanozantha. This was not rectified until 1933 when it was correctly identified as the male Latrodectus katipo.

Habitat

The katipō is restricted to a highly specialised habitat and is only found near the seashore among sand dunes. They generally reside on the landward side of dunes closest to the coast where they are most sheltered from storms and sand movement. They can sometimes be associated with dunes several kilometres from the sea when these dunes extend inland for long distances.

Webs are typically established in low-growing dune plants and other vegetation such as the native pīngao (Ficinia spiralis) or the introduced marram grass (Ammophila arenaria). They may also build their webs under driftwood, stones, or other debris such as empty tin cans or bottles. Webs are almost always constructed over open sand and near the ground so as to catch crawling insects for food. Spiders inhabiting dune grasses construct their webs in open spaces between the grass tufts, while spiders inhabiting areas of shrubbery do so on the underside of a plant overhanging open sand. It has been found that these patches of open sand are necessary for katipō to build their webs as plants that envelop sand dunes in dense cover, such as exotic plants like kikuyu or buffalo grass, create an environment unsuitable for web construction. The katipō therefore prefers to spin its web amongst pīngao plants as this plant's growth pattern leaves patches of sand between each plant. The wind can then blow insects and other prey through these gaps and into the web. Marram grass has been extensively planted in New Zealand to help stabilise sand dunes and has largely replaced pīngao in many areas. Because marram grass grows in a very tight formation only leaving small gaps between tuffs, this makes it difficult for the katipō to construct a suitable web for capturing prey.

Like other theridiid spiders, the web is a disorganised, irregular tangle of fine textured silk. It is hammock-shaped and is made up of opaque yellowish-white silk. The web consists of a broad base with many supporting threads above and below, including a number of sticky guy lines anchored to debris in the sand. A cone-shaped retreat is built in the lower part of the web, although the katipō can normally be found near the main body of the web. The plants it builds its web in provide support and shelter for the nest.

Range

The katipō is endemic to New Zealand. In the North Island it is found along the West Coast from Wellington to North Cape. On the east coast of the North Island it occurs irregularly, however, it is abundant on Great Barrier Island. In the South Island it is found in coastal regions south to Dunedin on the east coast and south to Greymouth on the west coast.

The red katipō is found south of approximately 39°15′ S (the western tip of Taranaki on the west coast, and just north of Waipatiki Beach in Hawke's Bay on the east coast). The black katipō is found north of approximately 38° S (Aotea Harbour, just north of Kawhia on the west coast, and Waipiro Bay and just south of the Bay of Plenty on the east coast). Both forms are found in the area in between these latitudes.

Behaviour

Diet
The katipō typically catches wandering ground invertebrates such as beetles (e.g. Cecyropa modesta) or amphipods (e.g. Bellorchestia quoyana), but it may occasionally catch moths, flies, and other spiders. Katipō can catch insects much larger than themselves. These larger insects often become entangled in the web and in the ensuing struggle, the web's ground anchor line breaks. The silk's elasticity causes the prey to become suspended a few centimetres off the ground. The katipō then moves to the prey, turns so that the spinnerets are facing the insect and spins silk over it. Like most theridiids, the tarsi of the hind legs have a row of strong curved bristles which are arranged as a comb. The katipō uses these to scoop sticky silk from its spinnerets and throws it over the insect with a series of rapid movements. After the insect is firmly immobilised, the spider bites it several times, usually at the joints, before spinning more silk to strengthen the web, and then administering a last long bite which ultimately kills the insect. The spider then moves the prey up into the web until it is ready to eat. If food is readily available then it is common to see five or six insects hanging in the web waiting to be ingested. The male's hunting behaviour is similar to the female's, although may not be as vigorous due to its smaller size.

Reproduction
The male wanders as an adult and in August or September goes looking for the females' webs to mate. The male will enter the female's web and vibrate the silk as he approaches her. The female is usually aggressive at first and will chase the male from the web. The courtship process consists of the male bobbing, plucking and tweaking the web along with periods of cautious approach and being chased by the female. Eventually, when she becomes docile and allows him to approach, the male will then approach the female as she hangs quietly upside down in the web. The male moves onto her ventral abdomen, tapping her rapidly until she moves to align his abdomen above hers. He then inserts his palps one at a time, leaving the female between each insertion. Copulation occurs over 10 to 30 minutes. After mating, the male retreats to groom, which is performed by running his palps and legs through his fangs and wiping them over his body. The male is not eaten by the female unlike some other widow spiders.

The females lay their eggs in November or December. The eggs are round, about the size of a mustard seed, and are a transparent, purplish red. The female constructs five or six egg sacs over the next three to four weeks. Each egg sac contains about 70 to 90 fertilised eggs. The egg sacs are hung in the centre of the spider's web and the female spins more silk over them. Over time, the exterior of the egg sac may become covered with sand. After six weeks of incubation, during January and February, the spiderlings hatch. The young spiders then disperse from the web. Little is known about the dispersal mechanism that the spiderlings use to move away from the nest. In one study, observing spiders over 24 hours, 28% used a ballooning method, which is where the young spiders use air currents to carry themselves away from the nest suspended by a single web strand, while the majority, 61%, used a bridging method where the spiderling uses its silk to move to nearby plants, and 11% still remained in the nest. The young spiderlings reach full maturity the following spring.

The close relationship between the katipō and redback is shown when mating. A male redback is able to successfully mate with a female katipō producing hybrid offspring. However, a male katipō cannot mate with the female redback as the male katipō is heavier than the male redback, and when it approaches the web it triggers a predatory response in the female leading to the male being eaten before mating occurs. There is evidence of interbreeding between katipō and redbacks in the wild.

Predators
The katipō has only one known direct predator: a small, undescribed native wasp from the family Ichneumonidae has been observed feeding on katipō eggs.

Population decline
The katipō is an endangered species and has recently become threatened with extinction. It is estimated that there are only a few thousand katipō left in about 50 areas in the North Island and eight areas in the South Island, making it rarer than some species of kiwi. A number of factors have contributed to its decline; the major ones appear to be loss of habitat and the declining quality of the remaining habitat. Human interference with their natural habitat has been occurring for over a century following European settlement. Coastal dune modification resulting from agriculture, forestry, or urban development, along with recreational activities like the use of beach buggies, off-road vehicles, beach horse riding and driftwood collection have destroyed or changed areas where katipō lives. The introduction of many invasive exotic plants has also contributed to the decline of suitable habitat.

Foreign spiders have colonised areas where suitable habitat remains. The major coloniser is the South African spider Steatoda capensis. It was first reported in the 1990s and may have displaced the katipō along the west coast of the North Island from Wellington to Whanganui, although both the katipō and S. capensis have been found sharing the same dune systems or even co-existing under the same piece of driftwood, suggesting that the two species can co-exist in similar habitats. It is possible that the displacement of the katipō by S. capensis is due to its ability to recolonise areas from which the katipō had been displaced after storms or other dune modifications. Furthermore, S. capensis breeds year-round, produces more offspring and lives in a greater range of habitats which leads to greater pressure on the katipō. S. capensis also belongs to the family Theridiidae and shares many of the katipō's features. It is of similar size, shape, general coloration, but it lacks the red stripe on its back, and may have some red, orange or yellow on its abdomen. Due to these similarities it is commonly known in New Zealand as the "false katipō".

In 2010 the katipō was one of a dozen species of previously unprotected invertebrate given full protection under the 1953 Wildlife Act, noted as "iconic, vulnerable to harm, and in serious decline". Under the Act, killing an absolutely-protected species such as a katipō is punishable by a fine or even imprisonment.

Toxicology

The katipō has venom that is medically significant in humans, although bites are rare. The incidence of bites is low as it is a shy, non-aggressive spider. Their narrow range, diminishing population, and human awareness of where they live means humans rarely encounter katipō. The katipō will only bite as a last resort; if molested, the spider will usually fold up into a ball and drop to the ground or retreat to the nearest cover. If the threat continues, the spider may throw out silk against the interference. When restrained in any way or held against skin, such as if tangled up in clothing, the spider will then bite defensively. However, if the female is with an egg sac it will remain close by it and sometimes move offensively to bite any threat.

Bites from katipō spiders produce a syndrome known as latrodectism. The venoms of all Latrodectus spiders are thought to contain similar components with the neurotoxin α-latrotoxin being the main agent responsible. Most bites are caused by female spiders; the male katipō was considered too small to cause systemic envenoming in humans. However, bites from male redback spiders have been reported, suggesting male Latrodectus spiders can cause envenoming in humans. Bites by male spiders are much rarer than those by females, perhaps due to their smaller jaws rather than lacking venom of similar potency to females or being unable to administer an effective bite. Māori legends recall many deaths, the last of which appears to have been a Māori girl who – according to the missionary Thomas Chapman – died in approximately 1849. While there were reports of severe katipō bites in 19th or early 20th century records, no other fatalities from spider bites have since been reported in New Zealand. The most recent fatality seems to have been in 1901, as reported in the Evening Post on 25 September of that year: "AUCKLAND, This Day. Mr. George Twidle, aged 47, son of Mr. George Twidle of Pukekohe, was bitten by a katipo spider on 16 September. His arm swelled, and he suffered great pain till Saturday last, when he died. He leaves a widow and several children." The most recent reported katipō bites were to a Canadian tourist in 2010 and a kayaker in 2012.

Symptoms
The clinical features of latrodectism are similar for all species of Latrodectus spiders. It is generally characterised by extreme pain. Initially, the bite may be painful, but sometimes only feels like a pin prick or mild burning sensation. Within an hour victims generally develop more severe local pain with local sweating and sometimes piloerection (goosebumps). Pain, swelling and redness spread proximally from the site. Less commonly, systemic envenoming is heralded by swollen or tender regional lymph nodes; associated features include malaise, nausea, vomiting, abdominal or chest pain, generalised sweating, headache, fever, hypertension and tremor. Rare complications include seizure, coma, pulmonary edema, respiratory failure or localised skin infection. The duration of effects can range from a few hours to days, with severe pain persisting for over 24 hours after being bitten in some cases.

Treatment
Treatment is based on the severity of the bite; the majority of cases do not require medical care, and patients with localised pain, swelling and redness usually only require local application of ice and routine analgesics. Hospital assessment is recommended if simple analgesia does not resolve local pain or clinical features of systemic envenoming occur. In more severe bites, redback antivenom can be given. Redback antivenom can also cross-neutralise katipō venom, and it is used to treat envenoming from Latrodectus katipo in New Zealand. It is available from most major New Zealand hospitals. Antivenom will usually relieve the symptoms of systemic envenoming and is indicated in anyone suffering symptoms consistent with Latrodectus envenoming. Unlike some other antivenoms, it is not limited to patients with signs of severe, systemic envenoming. Particular indications for using antivenom are local then generalised pain, sweating or hypertension. However, good evidence to support the effectiveness of widow spider antivenoms is lacking and studies have cast some doubt on the efficacy of antivenoms in latrodectism. Pain relief agents, such as parenteral opiates, or benzodiazepines may be required as adjunct agents.

References

External links

 Katipō spider on the website of the Museum of New Zealand Te Papa Tongarewa
 Katipō discussed on RadioNZ Critter of the Week show, 15 April 2016

Latrodectus
Endemic fauna of New Zealand
Endemic spiders of New Zealand